Glanosuchus is a genus of scylacosaurid therocephalian from the Late Permian of South Africa. The type species G. macrops was named by Robert Broom in 1904. Glanosuchus had a middle ear structure that was intermediate between that of early therapsids and mammals. Ridges in the nasal cavity of Glanosuchus suggest it had an at least partially endothermic metabolism similar to modern mammals.

Description
Glanosuchus macrops was first described in 1904 by South African paleontologist Robert Broom, who named the genus and species on the basis of a nearly complete holotype skull. The skull has been distorted during fossilization and the bone is indistinguishable from the surrounding matrix in some parts. In illustrating the holotype, Broom chose to reconstruct the skull of the species rather than draw the actual specimen.

Like other early therocephalians, Glanosuchus had a long, deep snout and large canine teeth. The incisor teeth at the front of the upper jaw are also large and blade-like. There are six incisors on either side of the upper jaw, the furthest one being noticeably smaller than the rest. Five small pointed teeth are located behind each canine. The snout is wider in the front than it is behind, a usual feature among therapsids but present in several other related therocephalians. The nostrils are positioned at the tip of the snout and directed forward.

Paleobiology

Hearing
Glanosuchus represents an early stage in the development of the mammalian middle ear. Modern mammals have three bones in the middle ear (the malleus, incus, and stapes) that transfer sound energy from the eardrum to the fluid of the inner ear. The malleus and incus of mammals developed from the articular and quadrate of early therapsids. Studies of the bones of Glanosuchus show that it had a very thin plate of bone that acted as an eardrum, receiving sounds and transferring them to a small air-filled cavity. The stapes and vestibular foramen (the hole that connects the middle and inner ears) are preserved in one specimen of Glanosuchus that was examined by grinding away cross sections of the skull. The anular ligament, a ring-like structure that forms a seal between the end of the stapes and the rim of the vestibular foramen, was probably held in place by cartilage. The transfer of sound between the thin bony plate and the vestibular foramen in Glanosuchus was not as effective as it is in mammals, meaning that the animal had a less acute sense of hearing.

Metabolism

Glanosuchus may have been one of the first therapsids to achieve endothermy, or warm-bloodedness. Endothermy is seen today in mammals, the only living group of therapsids. Reptiles, the closest living relatives of mammals, are cold-blooded ectotherms with lower metabolic rates. Endothermic animals likely evolved from more primitive ectothermic synapsids sometime in the Permian or Triassic.

While fur, commonly accepted as a clear indication of endothermy, has not been found in non-mammalian therapsids, some skeletal features preserved in therapsid remains may be an indication of the metabolic rates of these animals. Modern mammals possess maxilloturbinates, which are a type of concha (shelf of bone) in the nasal cavity that collect moisture from inhaled air. As endotherms, mammals must breathe rapidly to supply enough oxygen for their high metabolisms. As oxygen passes into and out of the nasal cavity, it dries out the surrounding tissue. Water from inhaled air condenses on the maxilloturbinates, preventing the drying out of the nasal cavity and allowing mammals to inhale enough oxygen to support their high metabolisms.

Reptiles and more primitive synapsids have conchae, but these plates of bone are involved in sensing smell rather than preventing desiccation. While the maxilloturbinates of mammals are located in the path of airflow to collect moisture, sensory cochae in both mammals and reptiles are positioned farther back and above the nasal passage, away from the flow of air. Glanosuchus has ridges positioned low in the nasal cavity, indicating that it had maxilloturbinates that were in the direct path of airflow. The maxilloturbinates may not have been preserved because they were either very thin or cartilaginous. The possibility has also been raised that these ridges are associated with an olfactory epithelium rather than turbinates. Nonetheless, the possible presence of maxilloturbinates suggests that Glanosuchus may have been able to rapidly breathe without drying out the nasal passage, and therefore could have been an endotherm.

Glanosuchus is the earliest known therapsid to possess maxilloturbinates, but it shares features with reptiles that suggest it was not fully endothermic. Choanae, two holes in the palate that connect the nasal cavity to the mouth, are positioned far forward in reptiles, early synapsids, and Glanosuchus. This shortens the nasal cavity, thereby reducing the ability to humidify incoming air. The choanae migrated farther back in the palate later in therocephalian evolution, suggesting that advanced forms like Bauria had high metabolic rates similar to those of mammals. As the choanae moved farther back, a secondary palate expanded in front of it. This expansion occurred in both therocephalians and the related cynodonts, indicating that the two groups were convergently acquiring mammalian characteristics in the Permian and Triassic. Although therocephalians died out by the Middle Triassic, cynodonts continued to diversify, giving rise to fully endothermic mammals in the Late Triassic.

References

Lopingian synapsids of Africa
Scylacosaurids
Fossil taxa described in 1904
Taxa named by Robert Broom
Lopingian genus first appearances
Lopingian genus extinctions